A caregiver or carer is a paid or unpaid member of a person's social network who helps them with activities of daily living. Since they have no specific professional training, they are often described as informal caregivers. Caregivers most commonly assist with impairments related to old age, disability, a disease, or a mental disorder.

Typical duties of a caregiver might include taking care of someone who has a chronic illness or disease; managing medications or talking to doctors and nurses on someone's behalf; helping to bathe or dress someone who is frail or disabled; or taking care of household chores, meals, or processes both formal and informal documentation related to health for someone who cannot do these things alone.

With an aging population in all developed societies, the role of caregiver has been increasingly recognized as an important one, both functionally and economically. Many organizations that provide support for persons with disabilities have developed various forms of support for carers as well.

Uses
A primary caregiver is the person who takes primary responsibility for someone who cannot care fully for himself or herself. The primary caregiver may be a family member, a trained professional or another individual. Depending on culture there may be various members of the family engaged in care. The concept can be important in attachment theory as well as in family law, for example in guardianship and child custody.

A person may need care due to loss of health, loss of memory, the onset of illness, an incident (or risk) of falling, anxiety or depression, grief, or a disabling condition.

Technique

Basic principles
A fundamental part of giving care is being a good communicator with the person getting care. Care is given with respect for the dignity of the person receiving care. The carer remains in contact with the primary health care provider, often a doctor or nurse, and helps the person receiving care make decisions about their health and matters affecting their daily life.

In the course of giving care, the caregiver is responsible for managing hygiene of themselves, the person receiving care, and the living environment. Hand washing for both caregivers and persons receiving care happen often. If the person receiving care is producing sharps waste from regular injections, then the caregiver should manage that. Surfaces of the living area should be regularly cleaned and wiped and laundry managed.

The caregiver manages organization of the person's agenda. Of special importance is helping the person meet medical appointments. Also routine daily living functions are scheduled, like managing hygiene tasks and keeping health care products available.

Monitoring

The caregiver is in close contact with the person receiving care and should monitor their health in a reasonable way.

Some people receiving care require that someone take notice of their breathing. It is expected that a caregiver would notice changes in breathing, and that if a doctor advised a caregiver to watch for something, then the caregiver should be able to follow the doctor's instructions in monitoring the person.

Some people receiving care require that the caregiver monitor their body temperature. If this needs to be done, a doctor will advise the caregiver on how to use a thermometer. For people who need blood pressure monitoring, blood glucose monitoring, or other specific health monitoring, then a doctor will advise the care giver on how to do this. The caregiver should watch for changes in a person's mental condition, including becoming unhappy, withdrawn, less interested, confused, or otherwise not as healthy as they have been. In all monitoring, the caregiver's duty is to take notes of anything unusual and share it with the doctor.

Keeping the person mentally alert
There is a link between mental health and physical health and mind–body interventions may increase physical health by improving mental health. These practices seek to improve a person's quality of life by helping them socialize with others, keep friendships, do hobbies, and enjoy whatever physical exercise is appropriate.

Caregivers encourage people to leave their homes for the health benefits of the resulting physical and mental activity. Depending on a person's situation, a walk through their own neighborhood or a visit to a park may require planning or have risks, but it is good to do when possible.

Depending on a person's situation, it may be useful for them to meet others also getting similar care services. Many places offer exercise groups to join. Social clubs may host hobby groups for art classes, social outings, or to play games. For elderly people there may be senior clubs which organize day trips.

Eating assistance
Caregivers help people have a healthy diet. This help might include giving nutrition suggestions based on the recommendations of dietitians, monitoring body weight, addressing difficulty swallowing or eating, complying with dietary restrictions, assisting with the use of any dietary supplements, and arranging for pleasant mealtimes.

A healthy diet includes everything to meet a person's food energy and nutritional needs. People become at risk for not having a healthy diet when they are inactive or bedbound; living alone; sick; having difficulty eating; affected by medication; depressed; having difficulty hearing, seeing, or tasting; unable to get food they enjoy; or are having communication problems. A poor diet contributes to many health problems, including increased risk of infection, poor recovery time from surgery or wound healing, skin problems, difficulty in activities of daily living, fatigue, and irritability. Older people are less likely to recognize thirst and may benefit from being offered water.

Difficulty eating is most often caused by difficulty swallowing. This symptom is common in people after a stroke, people with Parkinson's disease or who have multiple sclerosis, and people with dementia. The most common way to help people with trouble swallowing is to change the texture of their food to be softer. Another way is to use special eating equipment to make it easier for the person to eat. In some situations, caregivers can be supportive by providing assisted feeding in which the person's independence is respected while the caregiver helps them take food in their mouth by placing it there and being patient with them.

Support with managing medications
Caregivers have a vital role in supporting people with managing their medications at home. A person living with chronic illness may have a complex medication regimen with multiple medications and doses at different times of the day. Caregivers may assist in managing medications in many ways. This may range from going to the pharmacy to collect medications, helping with devices such as a Webster-pak or a dosette box, or actually administering the medications at home. These medications might include tablets, but also cremes, injections or liquid medications. It is important that the healthcare providers in the clinic help educate caregivers since those caregivers will often be the ones that manage medications over the long term for an individual living with a chronic condition at home.

Changes to the home

Living arrangements
To have a caregiver, a person may have to decide on changes on where they live and with whom they live. When someone needs a caregiver, the two must meet, and this typically happens either in the person's own home or the caregiver's home. Consequently, this could mean that a person moves to live with the caregiver, or the caregiver moves to live with the person. It is also possible that the caregiver only visits occasionally or is able to provide support remotely, or that the person who needs care is able to travel to the caregiver to get it.

A common example of this is when a parent gets older and has previously lived alone. If the parent's children are to be caregivers, then they may move in with the parent or have the parent move in with them.

Safety in the home
Persons who need care are also frequently people who need homes that are accessible in a way that matches their needs. If the caregiving plan calls for a check on the home, then typically this includes checking that the floor is free from hazards which could cause a falling, has temperature control which suits the person getting care, and has faucets and knobs which suit the users. To reduce risk of any major problem, smoke detectors should be put in place and appropriate physical security measures taken for home safety.

Complications

Discontinuing unnecessary treatment
For some diseases, such as advanced cancer, there may be no treatment of the disease which can prolong the life of the patient or improve the patient's quality of life. In such cases, standard medical advice would be for the caregiver and patient to have conversations with the doctor about the risks and benefits of treatment and to seek options for palliative care or hospice.

During end-of-life care the caregiver can assist in discussions about screening which is no longer necessary. Screenings which would be indicated at other times of life, like colonoscopy, breast cancer screening, prostate cancer screening, bone density screening, and other tests may not be reasonable to have for a person at the end of life who would not take treatment for these conditions and who would only be disturbed to learn they had them. It can be the caregivers place to have conversations about the potential benefits for screenings and to participate in discussions about their usefulness. An example of a need for caregiver intervention is to talk with people on dialysis who cannot have cancer treatment and can have no benefit from cancer screening, but who consider getting the screening.

People with diabetes who use caregiving services, like those in a nursing home, frequently have problems using sliding-scale insulin therapy, which is the use of varying amounts of insulin depending on the person's blood sugar. For people receiving caregiving services, long-acting insulin doses are indicated with varying doses of insulin being less preferable treatment. If exceptions must be made, then use the long-acting insulin and correct with small doses of sliding scale insulin before the biggest meal of the day.

Advance care planning should note if a patient is using an implantable cardioverter-defibrillator (ICD) and give instructions about the circumstances in which leaving it activated would be contrary to the patient's goals. An ICD is a device designed to prevent cardiac arrhythmia in heart patients. This is a life saving device for people who have a goal to live for a long time, but at the end of life it is recommended that the caregiver discuss deactivating this device with the patient and health care provider. For patients at the end of life, the device rarely prevents death as intended. Using the device at the end of life can cause pain to the patient and distress to anyone who sees the patient experience this. Likewise, ICDs should not be implanted in anyone who is unlikely to live for more than a year.

Responding to dementia

People with dementia need support from their caregivers, yet caregivers do no always have sufficient guidance for using multiple patient interventions. Findings from a 2021 systematic review of the literature found caregivers of patients in nursing homes with dementia do not have sufficient tools or clinical guidance for behavioral and psychological symptoms of dementia (BPSD) along with medication use. At the same time simple measures like talking to people about their interest can improve the quality of life for care home residents living with dementia. A programme showed that such simple measures reduced residents' agitation and depression. They also needed fewer GP visits and hospital admissions, which also meant that the programme was cost-saving.

People with dementia can become restless or aggressive but treating these behavior changes with antipsychotic drugs is not a preferable option unless the person seems likely to harm themselves or others. Antipsychotic drugs have undesirable side effects, including increasing risk of diabetes, pneumonia, stroke, disruption of cognitive skill, and confusion, and consequently are better avoided when possible. Alternatives to using these drugs is trying to identify and treat underlying causing of irritability and anger, perhaps by arranging for the person to spend more time socializing or exercising. Antidepressants may also help. A caregiver who can try other options can improve the patient's quality of life.

People with dementia are likely to lose memories and cognitive skill. Drugs such as donepezil and memantine can slow the loss of function but the benefits to the patient's quality of life are few and in some cases there may not be any. Such drugs also have many undesirable side effects. Before using these drugs, the caregiver should discuss and consider treatment goals for the patient. If the drugs are used, then after twelve weeks, if the caregiver finds that goals are not being met, then use of the drugs should be discontinued.

People with dementia are likely to have difficulty eating and swallowing. Sometimes feeding tubes are used to give food to people with dementia, especially when they are in the hospital or a nursing home. While feeding tubes can help people gain weight, they carry risks including bleeding, infection, pressure ulcers, and nausea. Whenever possible, use assisted feeding in preference. Besides being a safer alternative to the feeding tube, it creates an opportunity for social interaction which can also be comforting to the person being fed.

In many cases, people with dementia will begin to wander and become lost. GPS tracking devices can be used in these situations. Such devices provide an extra layer of security, allowing family members and caregivers to quickly locate the person if they become lost. However, these devices can be expensive, so it is important to research the different options available before making a purchase. GPS tracking can also raise ethical issues such as privacy and autonomy, so it is important to consider all sides before deciding if this is the right option for a particular person.

Caregivers should also be aware of the risk of elder abuse. Elder abuse can include physical, emotional and financial abuse, as well as neglect. Signs of elder abuse can include depression, unusual changes in behavior or appearance, bed sores, and unexplained bruises. It is important to talk with a doctor if there are any concerns that someone may be suffering from elder abuse. 

Trainings about dementia are also available for family members and caregivers. These trainings provide information about the condition, how it affects different people differently, and techniques for providing care to a person with dementia. Caregivers can also join support groups in order to share their experiences and further develop the skills needed to provide the best possible care. Moreover, there are groups of trained caregivers who can come to visit and provide care in the home, giving family members a break from providing full-time care. 

When responding to various issues that arise in caring for someone with dementia, it is important to remember that the person is a unique individual. Each case needs to be assessed on an individual basis and appropriate interventions devised accordingly. With patience and understanding, caregivers can make a real difference in their loved one's quality of life. 

There are many support groups and resources available for family members and caregivers of people with dementia. Such groups can provide emotional support as well as practical advice on how to best care for someone with the condition. Caregivers need to remember that they too need support in dealing with their feelings about the situation and that it is okay to ask for help from others.

Behavior changes
Caregivers can help people understand and respond to changes in their behavior.

Caregivers are recommended to help people find alternatives to using sleep medication when possible. Sleeping medications do not provide a lot of benefit to most people and have side effects including causing memory problems and confusion, increasing risk of blood clots, and bringing weight gain. Caregivers can help people improve their sleep hygiene in other ways, such as getting regular exercise, keeping to a sleep schedule, and arranging for a quiet place to sleep.

Caregivers are recommended to help people find alternatives to using appetite stimulants or food supplements high in food energy. These treatments are not proven to provide benefit over alternatives but they do increase the risk of various health problems. One alternative to using appetite stimulants is to provide social support, as many people are more comfortable eating when sharing a meal with others. People who have trouble eating may appreciate assisted feeding from their caregiver. Depending on the situation, a caregiver, patient, and physician may decide to forgo any dietary restrictions such as a low sodium diet and feed the person what they enjoy eating despite the health consequences if that seems preferable to avoiding appetite stimulants.

Promoting self-care

Self-care has been defined as "a process of maintaining health through health promoting practices and managing illness". Self-care may be performed for several reasons, whether in response to disease or injury, to manage chronic conditions, to maintain health, or for the preservation of self. There are many different factors that may influence self-care, including knowledge and educational background, physical limitations, economic status, culture, and social support, to name a few. Additionally, the process of self-care can be performed individually or with the assistance of a caregiver.

Caregiver-patient interactions form dynamic relationships that vary based on multiple factors, including disease, comorbid conditions, dependence level, and personal relationship, among others. The term "caregiver" can refer to people who take care of someone with a chronic illness or a supporter who influences the self-care behaviors of another person. Couples often form an interdependent relationship that is linked to their health. The close dynamics of these relationships can influence self-care behavior and transform it from a self-centered behavior to a relationship-centered behavior. Adopting a relationship-centered mindset can lead to enhanced motivation for both partners to carry out self-care behaviors and support one another in the process.

Multiple studies have demonstrated the significant role that caregivers play in promoting self-care in persons with an illness. A study observing the effects of a supportive intervention for caregivers of patients with heart failure found higher and statistically significant self-care behavior scores in the intervention group. Another research study conducted by Chen et al. identified higher social support as one of the main factors associated with improved functioning and a higher quality of life in patients with chronic obstructive pulmonary disease (COPD). The presence of higher social support also had positive effects on the physical and mental health of these persons. COPD patients with a caregiver were found to have lower rates of depression and increased participation in pulmonary rehabilitation, indicating the critical role a caregiver plays in influencing patient success.

As mentioned, caregivers can promote self-care in a variety of ways. A research study performed in Lebanon found that family-centered self-care has the potential to reduce the risk of hospital readmission in patients diagnosed with heart failure. Additionally, having the support of a family member can motivate patients to perform adequate self-care and increase adherence to their treatment plan. The environment surrounding a patient and disease has proved to be an important factor in improving clinical outcomes. Specifically, family-focused caregivers providing supportive interventions can help to improve the self-care behaviors of patients with various different diseases. When patients were asked to describe the influence of family or caregiver support, they stressed the critical role these supporters played in remaining on track with their medications, dietary choices, and exercise behaviors.

Clinical decision-making

Despite the evidence of self-care promotion, caregivers are consistently underused during clinical encounters. Caregivers can contribute significantly to promoting patient wellness, including promoting patient independence and self-care. However, despite studies demonstrating caregivers' daily and positive contributions to patients' self-care, and their ability to offer perceptions, insights, and concerns, providers are not meaningfully engaging caregivers during the decision-making process for chronic care management. Ignoring the caregiver not only leaves the burden of illness on patients' shoulders but may also prevent caregivers from obtaining the knowledge they need to provide clinically effective care and promote self-care.

The perceptions and needs of caregivers are inconsistently and seldom incorporated in designing and implementing interventions. Supporting research concludes that when caregivers are engaged in provider-patient encounters, patients report higher satisfaction with the clinical experience. The benefits of engaging caregivers during the clinical decision-making process include—and are not limited to—better patient understanding of provider advice, enhancement of patient-provider communication, better prioritization of patient concerns, and emotional support for the patient. These benefits are essential to the performance of self-care.

Caregiver stress

The stress associated with caring for chronically ill family members may result in stress for the caregiver. This caregiver stress has been associated with higher risk of mental, and physical health problems, poorer immunity  and higher blood pressure. According to a UK-based study, almost two out of three carers of people with dementia feel lonely. Most of the carers in the study were family members of friends.

Home care providers (e.g. spouses, children of elderly parents and parents) themselves contribute a huge sum in the national economy.  In most parts, the economic contribution or quantification of home care providers is not accounted for.  However, along with the unseen and unaccounted for economic contribution, the work toll and the loss of opportunity and the physical and mental drainout is also substantial. Sometimes to provide for sick individuals proves to be both a huge physical and mental strain. In the case of professional caregivers, it has been well researched and documented in last few decades that this mental strain is much higher than those providing care for family members.  Care provided for family members - especially partners who are intellectually disabled or have non-physical disorders, the degree of mental strain are high to the point of the caregivers themselves at risk of being psychologically damaged due to the high demanding situations both of physical toll complicated with non-professional work environment (lack of institutional care-giving equipment – both in terms of work-safety equipment  and care providing equipment), safety concerns and behavioral issue .

The physical, emotional and financial consequences for the family caregiver can be overwhelming. Caregivers responsible for an individual with a psychiatric disorder can be subject to violence. Elderly caregivers appear to be at particular risk. Respite can provide a much needed temporary break from the often exhausting challenges faced by the family caregiver.

Respite is the service most often requested by family caregivers, yet it is in critically short supply, inaccessible, or unaffordable regardless of the age or disability of the individual needing assistance. While the focus has been on making sure families have the option of providing care at home, little attention has been paid to the needs of the family caregivers who make this possible.

Without respite, not only can families suffer economically and emotionally, caregivers themselves may face serious health and social risks as a result of stress associated with continuous care-giving. Three fifths of family caregivers age 19-64 surveyed recently by the Commonwealth Fund reported fair or poor health, one or more chronic conditions, or a disability, compared with only one-third of non-caregivers.

In the United States today there are approximately 61.6 million people (referenced above) who are caring at home for family members including elderly parents, and spouses and children with disabilities and/or chronic illnesses. Without this home-care, most of these cared for loved ones would require permanent placement in institutions or health care facilities at great cost to society.

A 2021 Cochrane review found that remotely delivered interventions including support, training and information may reduce the burden for the informal caregiver and improve their depressive symptoms. However, there is no certain evidence that they improve health-related quality of life. The findings are based on moderate certainty evidence from 26 studies.

Caregivers and Occupational Therapy

Non-paid Caregivers' Health
Non-paid caregivers, such as adult children or spouses, are particularly at risk for increased stress. Caregiving tasks may require 24/7 attention and supervision, which reduces the amount of time participating in other meaningful occupations such as paid work and leisure activities. In a study examining the role of spousal caregivers for stroke survivors, many non-paid caregivers reported their experience as immensely exhausting and challenging. Furthermore, spouses and other non-paid caregivers have a higher risk of developing physical and mental health problems than the general population.  The British GP Patient Survey shows that the health of unpaid carers is significantly poorer than that of their non-carer peers.

Guidance from social workers and occupational therapists has proven beneficial in reducing anxiety and a lower sense of burden among non-paid caregivers. Occupational therapists provide caregiver training to promote self care and holistic wellness, fall prevention, home modification, and aging in place. The goal of occupational therapy intervention is to reduce the burden of care on the caregiver. A typical plan of care begins with a questionnaire (Caregiver Burden Scale), an at-home environmental risk assessment, and determination of patient independence level to identify resources to reduce caregiver stress. Occupational therapy's underlying framework is based upon participation in meaningful tasks to promote mental, physical and emotional health.

Occupational Therapists can also conduct evaluations, conduct certain interventions and consultations services remotely via telehealth. For caregivers living remotely, working from home, or otherwise have limited access to healthcare this is a vital service. Other health providers are increasingly providing services to caregivers, such as psychologists and social workers.

Society and culture

Caregiving by country

Caregiving is the regional variation of caregiving practices as distinguished among countries.

Caregiving certification
Some agencies, such as nursing homes and assisted living communities, require caregiver certification as a condition for employment. Most US states have caregiver resource centers that can assist in locating a reputable training class. In many cases, training is available at local colleges, vocational schools, organizations such as the American Red Cross, and at local and national caregiver organizations. National organizations include the National Association for Home Care and Hospice, the Family Caregiver Alliance and the National Family Caregivers Association.
To become a certified home care aide in the state of Washington, the candidate will need to:
Complete a home care aide application, including the Employment Verification form.
Undergo a Washington State Department of Social and Health Services (DSHS) criminal background check.
Complete a 75-hour basic training course approved by DSHS.
Pass the home care aide knowledge and skills certification examinations.

The social psychology of caregiving

Informal caregiving for someone with an acquired disability entails role changes that can be difficult. The person with the disability becomes a care-receiver, often struggling for independence and at risk of stigmatisation.  Simultaneously, family and friends become informal caregivers, a demanding and usually unfamiliar role. Adaptation to these role changes is complex. Caregivers and care-receivers often work together to avoid stigma and compensate for the disability. However, each side experiences divergent practical, social and emotional demands which can also fracture the relationship, creating disagreements and misunderstandings.

Caregivers and care-receivers have been found to disagree about many things, including, care needs, risks and stress, and level of knowledge. it has also been found that caregivers rate care-receivers as more disabled than care-receivers rated themselves. Noble and Douglas found that family members wanted intensive interventions which were support focused, whereas care-receivers placed emphasis on interventions that fostered independence. Many disagreements centre on caregivers' identity, particularly their overprotectiveness, embarrassment, independence, and confidence

These disagreements and misunderstandings, it has been argued, stem in part from caregivers concealing the demands of care. Caregivers often conceal the demands of care in order to make the person receiving care feel more independent. But, this can result in the person receiving care feeling more independent than they are, and subsequently a range of misunderstandings. It has also been argued that caregivers concealing the burden of care may end up undermining their own identity, because they do not get the social recognition necessary to create a positive identity – their toil becomes invisible. This has been termed 'the caregiving bind,' namely, that caregivers concealing the demands of care to protect and support the identity of the care-receiver, may end up undermining their own caregiving identity.

Economics
The amount of caregiving which is done as unpaid work exceeds the amount done as work for hire. In the United States, for example, a 1997 study estimated the labor value of unpaid caregiving at  billion, while the formal home health care work sector generated  billion and nursing home care generated  billion. The implication is that since so much personal investment is made in this sector, social programs to increase the efficiency and efficacy of caregivers would bring great benefit to society if they were easy to access and use.

Terminology
The term "caregiver" is used more in the United States, and Canada, while "carer" is more commonly used in the United Kingdom, New Zealand, and Australia.

The term "caregiver" may be prefixed with "live-in", "family", "spousal", "child", "parent", "young" or "adult" to distinguish between different care situations, and also to distinguish them definitively from the paid version of a caregiver, a Personal Care Assistant or Personal Care Attendant (PCA). Around half of all carers are effectively excluded from other paid employment through the heavy demands and responsibilities of caring for a vulnerable relative or friend. The term "carer" may also be used to refer to a paid, employed, contracted PCA.

The general term dependent care (i.e., care of a dependent) is also used for the provided help. Terms such as "voluntary caregiver" and "informal carer" are also used occasionally, but these terms have been criticized by carers as misnomers because they are perceived as belittling the huge impact that caring may have on an individual's life, the lack of realistic alternatives, and the degree of perceived duty of care felt by many relatives.

More recently, Carers UK has defined carers as people who "provide unpaid care by looking after an ill, frail or disabled family member, friend or partner". Adults who act as carers for both their children and their parents are frequently called the Sandwich Generation.The sandwich generation is the generation of people who care for their aging parents while supporting their own children.

See also
 Family carergivers
 Dignity of risk
 Outline of relationships
 Toileting

References

Further reading
 
 
 Carol Levine, ed. (2004) Always On Call: When Illness Turns Families into Caregivers (2nd ed.), Vanderbilt University Press for the United Hospital Fund. 
 Dr. Marion Somers Elder Care Made Easier: Doctor Marion's 10 Steps to Help You Care for an Aging Loved One, Addicus Books, 2006. 
 Joyce Cavaye (2006) Hidden Carers, Dunedin Press, Edinburgh, 
 Bonnie Campbell McGovern (2007) Taking Care of Barbara: A Journey Through Life and Alzheimer's and 29 Insights for Caregivers.  
 Ann Burack-Weissi, "The Caregiver's Tale: Loss and Renewal in Memoirs of Family Life", Journal of Marriage and Family, 69, no. 1 (2007): 271-272 
 Sylvia Barron Baca (2007) Caregiver Daily Journal Gardners Books  
 Maria M Meyer, Derr RN, Stanley, Tandberg (2014).  Caregiving in the Comfort of Home: A Complete Guide for Caregivers.  CareTrust Publications.

External links

 Becoming a Family Caregiver, a guide available in English, Spanish, Chinese, and Russian

 
Unpaid work